Denver and the Mile High Orchestra (DMHO) is a horn-driven band based out of Nashville, Tennessee. DMHO was formed by a group of friends at Belmont University in 1999. They have traveled across the world, playing at churches, conferences, and festivals. They have performed at two Olympic Games (2002-Salt Lake City, 2004-Athens), and were the house band at the 2005 Gospel Music Association Music Awards. DMHO finished third on The Next Great American Band, a "battle of the bands" reality show that aired on Fox in late 2007.

Personnel (as of 4/27/07)
Denver Bierman - Bandleader, Composer/Arranger, Lead Vocals, Trumpet

Trumpets
Scott Steward - Lead trumpet, Vocals
Adam Beck
Reggie Grisham
Keith Everette Smith

Saxophones
Chris Gregg - Alto Saxophone, tenor saxophone, Soprano Saxophone, Vocals
Michael "Motown" Kemp - Tenor Saxophone
Eric Kilby - Baritone Sax

Trombones
"Hey" Kenn "Blues" Hughes - lead, Musical Director
Justin Carpenter

Rhythm
Jeff Pardo - Piano, Keyboards, Vocals
Tony Marvelli - Bass, Vocals
Jared Ribble - Drums
Paul Gregory - Guitar

Tour Personnel
Nathan Bierman - CFO, Marketing Director, Merchandise Manager
"Big Papa" Eric Kilby - Tour Manager, Production Manager

Discography

Albums
Mile High Hymns, 2014
Live! It Up, 2006
Swing! The Best of Denver & the Mile High Orchestra, 2005
Timeless Christmas, 2004
Good to Go, 2004
Stand, 2002
Act The Scat, 2001

EPs
EP, 2009
Christmas Pre-Release EP, 2003
Big Band Patriot EP, 2003

DVDs
Let Freedom Ring (DVD/CD combo), 2011
Winter Wonderland (DVD/CD combo), 2007
Live at Long Hollow, 2005

Side projects
In 2009, various members of DMHO embarked on several side projects. Denver, Jared, Paul, Chris and tony started a side band called Planet VII.  Jeff plays keyboards for CCM artist Matthew West.  Scott had a small acting role in Hannah Montana: The Movie, as well as main spokesman roles in two network television commercials.  Denver, Chris and Justin played horns for pop/rock artist Kelly Clarkson during her 2009 summer tour and are currently involved in her fall tour and Paul Gregory Shearer has been touring with Mandisa. Most recently (2014), Scott Started his own band called "Force Ten" - a Rush Tribute Band where he is the lead vocalist and plays keyboards. A link to their band's first video can be found at https://www.youtube.com/watch?v=EHPcigbpd0M

External links

References

American Christian musical groups
Belmont University alumni
Musical groups from Nashville, Tennessee
Christian ska groups
Musical groups established in 1999
1999 establishments in Tennessee